The yellow-vented green pigeon (Treron seimundi) is a species of bird in the family Columbidae. It is found in Laos, Malaysia, Thailand, and Vietnam. Its natural habitats are subtropical or tropical moist lowland forest, subtropical or tropical mangrove forest, and subtropical or tropical moist montane forest.

References

yellow-vented green pigeon
Birds of Laos
Birds of Vietnam
Birds of Southeast Asia
yellow-vented green pigeon
Taxonomy articles created by Polbot